Mad Mad Mad Monsters is a 1972 traditional animated comedy film produced by Rankin/Bass Productions in the United States and animated overseas by Mushi Production in Japan. The special aired on September 23, 1972 as an episode of The ABC Saturday Superstar Movie. It is "related" to the 1967 stop motion animated film Mad Monster Party?

Plot
After Baron Henry von Frankenstein creates a Bride for his Monster, he decides to make arrangements for a lavish wedding at the Transylvania Astoria Hotel. Henry's assistant Igor is jealous of the Monster and wants the Bride for his own, much to the annoyance of Henry.

Arriving at the hotel, Henry gets the wedding booked on Friday the 13th while having the hotel manager Harold write down the required foods. He does turn down the flaming shish-kebabs idea since some of the guests are allergic to fire. Another thing Henry asks is for him to watch his pet vulture Rosebud and make sure he stays in his cage during the event since he does not want him bothering his guests.

Many monsters are invited to the wedding including Count Dracula, his son Boobula and Boobula's pet black cat, Ron Chanley the Werewolf, the Mummy, the Creature, Claude the Invisible Man, his invisible wife Nagatha, his invisible son Ghoul, and Ghoul's invisible dog Goblin when Harold's mailman brother Harvey delivers the invites.

Following his visit to a therapist, Harvey is asked by Harold to watch over the hotel while he takes a vacation. Once the wedding guests arrive, they terrify the guests and staff as the bellhop Norman gets the autographs of the monsters (since he believes them to be movie stars). Norman even talks to Count Dracula and Claude about a rumor that the Wicked Witch of the East will emerge from the cake at midnight during the bachelor party. Henry arrives to see that the Transylvania Astoria is as he likes it. He also reminds Harvey to keep an eye on Rosebud and make sure he stays in his cage.

When the bachelor party occurs, Count Dracula and Claude talk about the Monster's various moments in the past while Nagatha advises them not to embarrass the Monster. When the Bride is shown, the monsters are fascinated and start fighting each other (all except Claude and Nagatha who continue eating their dinner) and the two pets chase each other. As midnight happens, the Wicked Witch of the East does indeed emerge from the cake.

Igor begins to steal the Bride the next day when instructed to hide her until the wedding which does not go at all according to plan when the Bride ends up snatched up by a pterosaur and lands in the clutches of a giant gorilla named Modzoola.

Running back to the Transylvania Astoria, Igor uses charades to inform Henry what happened. While Harvey stays behind, Henry leads the monsters and Norman to rescue the Bride. When they catch up to Modzoola, they work to rescue the Bride. Just then, Modzoola's wife Mrs. Zoola shows up and Modzoola releases the Bride as Mrs. Zoola drags him off to deal with him.

When the wedding approaches, the Monster is nervous until Henry and Norman help him get over it and have his suit specially made. Due to the priest not showing up, Harvey is enlisted to wed them. When the monsters kiss as the Bride's face is shown, they release massive electrical energy that destroys the Transylvania Astoria.

Sometime later, Harvey visits the therapist again who tells him that monsters are not real. The therapist turns out to be Dr. Jekyll. When he drinks his elixir, Dr. Jekyll becomes Mr. Hyde and chases Harvey.

As the credits roll, the Creature, Count Dracula, Ron Chanley's werewolf form, the Mummy, Boobula, Claude and Ghoul, the Monster, his Bride, and their newborn child all join Mr. Hyde in chasing Harvey. Norman runs after them in order to get Mr. Hyde's autograph which will complete his collection of the monsters' autographs.

Cast
 Bob McFadden as Baron Henry von Frankenstein, Harvey
 Allen Swift as Count Dracula, Igor, the Monster, Claude the Invisible Man, Ghoul the Invisible Boy, Boobula (Count Dracula's son), Ron Chanley the Werewolf, Dr. Jekyll and Mr. Hyde, Rosebud the vulture, Harold, Post Office Boss
 Bradley Bolke as Norman the bellhop, additional voices
 Rhoda Mann as the Bride, Nagatha the Invisible Woman, Wicked Witch of the East, additional voices

Credits
 Produced and Directed by: Arthur Rankin, Jr. and Jules Bass
 Written by: William J. Keenan and Lou Silverstone
 Associate Producer: Basil Cox
 Animation Production by: Mushi Studios
 Animation Supervision: Steve Nakagawa
 Key Animation and Layout by: Yoshikazu Yasuhiko (uncredited)
 Sound Engineers: David Scott, Robert Elder
 Editorial Supervisor: Irwin Goldress
 Music: Maury Laws

Reception
It was called "visually stunning" but, because of the poor storyline, a "disappointing outing".

References

External links

1972 animated films
1972 films
1972 television films
1972 television specials
1970s American animated films
1970s science fiction comedy films
1970s monster movies
1970s American television specials
1970s animated television specials
The ABC Saturday Superstar Movie
American science fiction comedy films
American vampire films
Crossover films
Dracula films
Films scored by Maury Laws
Television shows directed by Jules Bass
Television shows directed by Arthur Rankin Jr.
Frankenstein films
Mummy films
American werewolf films
Rankin/Bass Productions television specials
1972 comedy films
1970s English-language films

pt:Mad Monster Party